In the NATO alliance Steadfast Noon is an annual two week training exercise for member countries in handling nuclear weapons. In 2022 this exercise commenced 17 October and culminated 30 October. The NATO exercise involved 14 nations. In 2022 the Steadfast Noon exercise was hosted by Belgium at Kleine Brogel Air Base; the training flights took place over Belgium, the UK, and the North Sea. The training aircraft were up to 60 in number and largely consisted of F-16s, Panavia Tornadoes, and B-52s. Surveillance and tanker aircraft also flew in support. No nuclear weapons were involved, but the crews were trained using mock devices.

Belgium, Germany, Italy, the Netherlands, and Turkey are the NATO nations holding B61 nuclear bombs in Europe. It would have taken the "explicit political approval of NATO’s Nuclear Planning Group (NPG)" and the authorization of the US and UK president and prime minister, respectively, to arm and load the B-61s.

The dangers of nuclear weapons 

In 2022 the US, Russia, China, Britain, and France issued a joint statement stating that a nuclear war could have no winner and must be avoided. However, in the face of threats of nuclear war (say from Russia, as threatened during the 2022 Russian invasion of Ukraine), NATO keeps about 100 B61 nuclear bombs in storage in Europe.  This material is from the Power projection article. 

Kyle Mizokami assesses Russia as no longer capable of successfully invading other countries with "the possible exception of Estonia, Latvia, and Lithuania"  which are protected by NATO Article Five.

Notes and references

military aviation